Badhauli is a village of Naraingarh tehsil of Ambala district of Haryana. According to the 2011 Census, there were 747 families residing in the village and its population was 4442, of whom 2346 were males and 2096 were females. Its most famous families are the banglewale, Chathalle and Kuapur families. The village belongs to powerful people.

References

Villages in Ambala district